Boehmeria macrophylla is a species of flowering plant in the nettle family Urticaceae, This herbaceous perennial is native to Asia. The flowers are dioecious or monoecious. Its flowering season is from June to September. 
It is commonly found in forests, thickets, along streams and roadsides. The species as a whole is characterized by the opposite leaves, spike-like inflorescences, and fruiting perianth with a rounded base. The varieties are very distinctive and their status needs more detailed assessment.

Uses

The fibre of the stem is shiny, white and strong, and is used for making sacks, bags, rough clothes, nets, and rope. It is possibly useful for textiles. The woody parts are moderately hard but too small for woodworking; however they make a good fuel.
Boehmeria macrophylla also has some medicinal applications, including as a tonic, for treating boils and for dermatitis. It is also used as an insecticide.

References

macrophylla